Kadhal Agadhi is a 2015 Indian Tamil-language romantic crime film directed by  Shami Thirumalai  and starring Harikumar and Mamta.

Plot 

The film is about a gangster, Sathya, who is unable to express his love to Savitri because he is always around thugs.

Cast 
Harikumar as Sathya
Mamtha as Savitri
Pandiarajan
Devadarshini
Pandi
Singamuthu
Lollu Sabha Manohar
Sudarshan Raj
Mamatha Ravath
Baby Meenu
Trichi Babu
Mysore Manjula

Production 
The film was shot in Bangalore, Chennai and Hyderabad. One stunt sequence was shot in a cave in Hosur.

Release and reception 
The film was removed two days after being in theatres in 2015 and was re-released in 2016.

Malini Mannath of The New Indian Express wrote that "A passable action-centric entertainer, Kadhal Agadhi at the most a stepping stone for a debutant maker". A critic from Samayam criticised the film and gave the film a rating of one-and-a-half out of five stars.

References 

2010s Tamil-language films
Romantic crime films